Wakhevitch, also transliterated Wakhévitch into French, official transliteration Vakevich is a Russian surname.

Notable people with this surname include:
 Georges Wakhévitch (1907-1984), Russian-French art director
 Igor Wakhevitch, French composer